Lorraine Hill (born 24 October 1946) is a former Australian cricketer.  A left-handed batsman and occasional right-arm medium pace bowler, she played 7 Test matches for Australia between 1975 and 1977, scoring two half-centuries and one century, an unbeaten 118 on her Test debut against New Zealand.  She also played in the 1973 and 1978 Women's Cricket World Cup.

References

External links
 
 Lorraine Hill at southernstars.org.au

1946 births
Living people
Australia women Test cricketers
Australia women One Day International cricketers
Cricketers from Perth, Western Australia
Women cricketers who made a century on Test debut
Sportswomen from Western Australia
Victoria women cricketers